The men's 60 metres hurdles event at the 1970 European Athletics Indoor Championships was held on 15 March in Vienna.

Medalists

Results

Heats
First 4 from each heat (Q) qualified directly for the semifinals.

Semifinals
First 3 from each heat (Q) qualified directly for the final.

Final

References

60 metres hurdles at the European Athletics Indoor Championships
60